Tak Jhal Mishti is a 2002 Bengali romantic movie directed by Basu Chatterjee. It stars Ferdous Ahmed and Priyanka Trivedi in the lead roles.

Cast
 Ferdous Ahmed
 Priyanka Trivedi
 Arjun Chakraborty
 Ramaprasad Banik
 Ratna Ghoshal
 Sonali Chakraborty
 Kharaj Mukherjee
 Ananya Chatterjee
 Moumita Chakraborty
 Mousumi Saha

Crew
 Director Basu Chatterjee
 Music Director Tabun Sutradhar

Soundtrack

References

External links
http://www.gomolo.in/Movie/Movie.aspx?mid=15213

2000s Bengali-language films
2002 films
Bengali-language Indian films